Haliru Alidu (born 24 February 1984) is a Togolese football midfielder. He currently plays for AS Douanes.

Alidu represented the Togo national football team in Egypt 2006 Africa Cup of Nations.

External links 

1984 births
Living people
Togolese footballers
Togo international footballers
AS Douanes (Togo) players
Association football midfielders
21st-century Togolese people